The Swedish Robotics Society started in 1984 in Stockholm, Sweden.

Founders
The founders of the Swedish Robotics Society are:
Lee Sandberg with a background of cognitive science, AI, and 3D game engines.
Leif Wikström built several robots.

The last robot built.

During the years 1980–1989, several robot controller cars were produced and a 3D robot-simulation engine for PC. Several smaller robots were built.

The Swedish Robotics Society has been covered by the Swedish media in daily papers, magazines, and radio.

References

Robotics organizations
Clubs and societies in Sweden
Organizations established in 1984
1984 establishments in Sweden
Robotics in Sweden